Thomas Luther (born November 4, 1969, in Erfurt) is a German chess player and International Grandmaster of chess. In 2000 he was a member of the German team that won the silver medal in the 34th Chess Olympiad in Istanbul.

Childhood and Youth 
He started to play chess at the age of four. Even in his childhood days he started to avidly read classic chess literature and learned a lot by himself. 1978 he became a member of the club HSG Medizin Erfurt. 1980, 1981 and 1984 he won the respective East Germany championship for his age class. 1986 he won the 12. GDR youth-championship in correspondence chess. Beginning with 1985 he played for Mikroelektronik Erfurt in the Oberliga, the highest league in the GDR.

Chess career 
1988 he was awarded the title International Master by FIDE. After a series of further successes, among them second places at the GDR championship in Zittau 1989 and in Altensteig 1991 and victories in Andorra 1992, Lenk and Hamburg 1993 and finally his first (all-)German championship 1993 (after a 2–0 victory in the final against Thomas Pähtz) he became Grandmaster in 1994.

World- and National Championship Results 
1997 Thomas Luther qualified for the world championships in Groningen. In this KO-tournament he won the first round 3.5–2.5 against Lajos Portisch but lost (0.5–1.5) against Vladimir Akopian in round 2.

2001 he qualified again and won the first round in Moscow 3–1 against Sergey Volkov but lost against Ilya Smirin (0.5–1.5).

In 2002 he won the German championship in Saarbrücken again, outdistancing Alexander Graf and Florian Handke.

He won his third German national championship in 2006 in Osterburg in a tie-breaker with Vitaly Kunin and Artur Yusupov.

German National Team 
Between 1998 and 2006 Thomas Luther was often part of the German selection representing Germany in various international team tournaments: in the Olympiads 1998 in Elista (6th place), 2000 in Istanbul (2nd place), 2002 in Bled (14th place) and 2006 in Turin (15th place). He also played for Germany in the World Team Chess Championship of 2001 and the European Team Chess Championship of 2003 in Plovdiv.

IPCA 
Thomas Luther, who suffers from dysmelia played at the 39th Chess Olympiad in Khanty-Mansiysk, 2010 first board for the IPCA (International Physically Disabled Chess Association) and made 6.5 points out of 10.

Tournament victories 
During his active career he won many international tournaments, i.e. Lippstadt (1994), Hastings (1994/95), Bissen (1995), Apolda (1994 and 1999), Turin (1996), Cienfuegos (1997), Bad Zwesten (1998), Nova Gorica (2000), Böblingen (2005), Oberwart (2005) and Bad Homburg (2008). In 2009 he won 6th LGA Premium Chess Cup in Nürnberg.

In October 2011 he won the first World Chess Games for Disabled with a perfect score of 7 out of 7.

FIDE official and DSB official 
He is the head of the FIDE Commission on Disabled and played for the IPCA team once. He is also head of the division for competitive chess (Referent für Spitzenschach) in the German chess federation.

Game 
Thomas Luther's style is tactically oriented, which makes him a formidable opponent for even the strongest player. The following game is typical where he attacks former Candidate Robert Hübner right out of the opening. The game was played in the penultimate round of the German championship 2002 and laid the ground for Thomas' later winning the title. The comments are based on personal conversations with Thomas Luther himself.

 Robert Hübner (2640) – Thomas Luther (2538)
 (74th German Individual Championship, Saarbrücken, 2002, Round 8)

 1. c2-c4 c7-c6 2. e2–e4 d7-d5 3. e4xd5 Ng8-f6

Black already offers a pawn sacrifice. Due to the gambit-style opening the position immediately becomes sharp and concrete.

 4. Qd1-a4

After 4. d5xc6 Sb8xc6 black has a good game.

 4. … e7-e6

Either way, Black absolutely wants to sacrifice a pawn.

 5. d5xe6 Bf8-c5 6. Ng1-f3

White didn't want to take the risk of accepting the second sacrifice. After 6. e6xf7+ Ke8xf7 the rook h8 dangerously comes into play too.

 6. … Nf6-g4

Again Black continues as aggressively as possible.

 7. d2-d4 Bc5xd4 8. Nf3xd4 Qd8xd4 9. Qa4-c2 Nb8-a6

The second knight joins the attack. Blacks opening strategy was successful.

 10. Nb1-a3 Bc8xe6 11. h2-h3 Na6-b4 12. Qc2-d2 Qd4-e4+ 13. Bf1-e2 Qe4xg2 14. Rh1-f1 Ng4-h2 (!)

Black starts a combination leading to material gain. The inconspicuous knight on h2 will single-handedly wreak havoc in Whites position.

 15. Qd2xb4 0-0-0 16. Na3-b5

A good try to molest the black king with a knight sacrifice. Black, though, has a spectacular counterpunch:

 16. … c6xb5 17. Bc1-f4

The threat is Qc5+, forcing Qc6 and the subsequent loss of a knight as Black would get mated otherwise.

 17. … Qg2xf1+ !!

This queen sacrifice starts the very effective deployment of the knight. Black wins material.

 18. Be2xf1 Nh2-f3+ 19. Ke1-e2 Nf3-d4+ 20. Ke2-d2

Asquiesces the discovered check but other king moves were even worse: Ke2-e1/e3 and Nd4-c2+ wins the queen.

 20. … Nd4-c6+ 21. Qb4-d6 Rd8xd6+ 22. Bf4xd6 Be6xc4

Black reaps the fruit of his combinatorial fireworks: the smoke has cleared and he is two pawns ahead.

 23. Kd2-c3 Rh8-d8 24. Bd6-f4 Bc4xf1 25. Ra1xf1 b5-b4+ 26. Kc3-c2 Rd8-d5 27. Bf4-e3 Kc8-d7 28. Rf1-g1 g7-g6 29. Rg1-g4 a7-a5 30. Rg4-h4 h7-h5 31. Rh4-f4 f7-f5 32. h3-h4 b7-b5 33. Rf4-f3 Nc6-d4+ 34. Be3xd4 Rd5xd4 35. Rf3-d3 Rd4xd3 36. Kc2xd3 g6-g5

This pawn breakthrough decides the game. The rest for completeness' sake:

 37. h4xg5 h5-h4 38. Kd3-e2 f5-f4 39. f2-f3 Kd6-e6 40. Ke2-f2 Ke6-f5 41. Kf2-g2 Kf5xg5 42. Kg2-h3 Kg5-h5 43. Kh3-g2 Kh5-g6 44. Kg2-h2 Kg6-f6 45. Kh2-h3 Kf6-e5 46. Kh3xh4 Ke5-d4
 White gave up!

Personal 
Luther has a congenital disability (dysmelia) on his arms. As a child he was considered to have no perspective in sports from GDR officials. He tells to have taken a great amount of energy out of experiencing that he can be as good as others.

Thomas Luther is author at ChessBase. He published various DVDs on opening theory and other topics. He is considered to be one of the leading experts on the French Defence, about which he published several times.

In 2009 he finished his studies at the University of Hagen acquiring the title of Diplomkaufmann (German equivalent to Master of Business Administration).

Luther's current Elo rating is 2528 (June 2020).

References

External links

 

1969 births
Living people
German chess players
Chess grandmasters
Chess Olympiad competitors
Sportspeople from Erfurt